The  mixed individual BC4 boccia event at the 2016 Summer Paralympics was contested from 13 September to 16 September at Sambodromo in Rio de Janeiro. 16 competitors took part.

The event structure was amended from the 2012 event, with pool stages added. The top two players from each of four round robin pools of four entered into a quarterfinal single-elimination stage, with the losing semifinalists playing off for bronze.

Elimination rounds

Pool stages

Pool A

Pool B

Pool C

Pool D

* Note : As this pool featured two athletes per nation, names/initials are given in the 'Head to head' section to avoid ambiguity

References

Individual BC4